Sorbus minima, commonly known as the lesser whitebeam or least whitebeam, is a shrub belonging to the subgenus Aria (whitebeams) in the genus Sorbus. It is endemic to Wales where it grows at a few sites in Breconshire. It is an apomictic microspecies which reproduces asexually and so is reproductively isolated from its close relatives such as the Swedish whitebeam, S. intermedia. It probably originated as a hybrid between the rock whitebeam (S. rupicola) and the rowan (S. aucuparia). It was first discovered in 1893 by Augustin Ley, the vicar of Sellack in Herefordshire who travelled widely in Wales.

It is a slender, deciduous shrub which can reach three metres in height. The leaves are 6–8 centimetres long and are fairly narrow and oval in shape being 1.8–2.2 times as long as they are broad. They are acutely pointed at the tip and base, have 7–10 (usually 8 or 9) pairs of veins and are lobed one fifth to one third of the way to the midrib. The flowers are produced in May and June and their petals are 4 millimetres long and white. The red berries are 6–8 millimetres across with a few small lenticels.

It grows on carboniferous limestone cliffs near Crickhowell in the eastern Brecon Beacons. The largest population is at Craig y Cilau National Nature Reserve where, in September 2002, 730 plants were counted within the reserve with several more in surrounding areas. Smaller numbers grow further west at Cwm Cleisfer and a single plant remains at Craig y Castell. It formerly also occurred at Blaen Onneu.

In 1947 the species was endangered by British Army mortar practice in and around its habitat. By raising the issue in the Commons, and inducing War Secretary Frederick Bellenger to order the Army to pull out of the area, Tudor Watkins, Labour MP for Brecon and Radnorshire is crediting with preserving the species from extinction.

The species has been affected by quarrying which has destroyed many plants and reduced the amount of available habitat. It can recolonize disused quarries but does not reach the same population density as at undisturbed sites. All the locations where the species grows, apart from Cwm Cleisfer, now have some kind of protection and a population is kept at the National Botanic Garden of Wales.

Sources
Ellis, R. G. (1983) Flowering Plants of Wales. National Museum of Wales, Cardiff.

Stace, Clive A. (1997) New Flora of the British Isles. Cambridge University Press.
Tutin, T. G. et al. (1968) Flora Europaea, Volume 2. Cambridge University Press.

References

External links

Distribution map for Sorbus minima
Photograph of the flower

minima
Endemic flora of Wales
Plants described in 1901